The 2013–14 Kuwaiti Premier League season was the 52nd since the league's establishment. This season in the Kuwaiti Premier League, there were 14 teams. This was the first time there had been 14 teams since the 2005–06 season. Kuwait SC came into this tournament as defending champion after they won the title last season following four seasons without a league title.

Teams
This season's Kuwaiti Premier League featured all 14 teams of the football pyramid, combining both the Premier League and Division One together, a structure last used in the 2005–06 Kuwaiti Premier League season. Fourteen teams played each other twice to determine the league champions.

Therefore, Kazma, who came bottom in the 2012–13 campaign avoided relegation. The end-of-season playoff between Al Salmiya and Al Shabab in which Al Salmiya won, thus didn't matter.

Teams joining the top flight are Khaitan (back after relegation in 2005–06), Al Fahaheel (back after relegation in 2006–07), Al Sahel (back after relegation in 2010–11), Al Shabab (back after relegation in 2011–12), Al Yarmouk (back after relegation in 2005–06), and Al Tadamun (back after relegation in 2009–10).

Stadia and locations
''Note: Table lists in alphabetical order.

Standings

Kuwait Premier League seasons
Kuwaiti Premier League
1